Chen Hui-shan (born 18 March 1985) is a Taiwanese female football goalkeeper. She has represented Chinese Taipei in the 2010 East Asian Football Championship.

Personal life
Chen's husband is professional baseball player Lin Yueh-ping. They married in April 2009.

References

Living people
Taiwanese women's footballers
1985 births
Chinese Taipei women's international footballers
Women's association football goalkeepers